Samaldas Arts College or Samaldas College is a college in Bhavnagar, Gujarat, India. It was founded in 1885 by Takhtsinhji, the Maharaja of Bhavnagar State in memory of his Diwan (minister) Samaldas Paramananddas Mehta. It is one of the oldest colleges in western India. It is affiliated to Maharaja Krishnakumarsinhji Bhavnagar University.

History

Samaldas College was established by Takhtsinhji, the Maharaja of Bhavnagar State in memory of his Diwan Samaldas Paramananddas Mehta. The college was affiliated to University of Bombay and the classes were opened in January 1885 in Majiraj Girls High School building.

The foundation stone of the building opposite Peel Garden was laid on 25 November 1884 by James Furgusson, Governor of Bombay. The building was opened on 17 December 1886 by Lord Reay, Governor Bombay. The building was occupied in 1893. The building was constructed by R. Proctor Sims, the Public Works Councillor. The building is now used as the Sheth J. P. Ayurveda College.

In 1932, Krishnakumarsinhji, Maharaja of Bhavnagar, built a new building for the college on Vaghawadi Road. The building is used as the P. P. Institute of Science since June 1963.

On 1 November 1955, Jawaharlal Nehru, the first Prime Minister of India, laid the foundation of the present building of the college. The college is now affiliated to Maharaja Krishnakumarsinhji Bhavnagar University.

Principals
The principal were as follows:
 R. H. Gunion (1885―1890)
 J. N. Unwalla (1890―1905)
 K. J. Sanjana (1905―1906)
 B. A. Enti (1906)
 K. J. Sanjana (1907―1923)
 T. K. Shahani (1923―1948)
 J. B. Sendil (1952―62)
 B. C. Desai (1962―66)
 S. M. Shah (1967―70)
 A. S. Prabhudesai  (1975―77)
 A. A. Shaikh (1994―)

Notable alumni
 Mahatma Gandhi (January 1888 ― June 1888), Indian independence leader
 Nautam Bhatt, physicist
 H. J. Kania, the first Chief Justice of India
 Anantrai Raval, critic and editor
 Yashwant Trivedi, poet, essayist and critic
 Harivallabh Bhayani, linguist, researcher, critic and translator
 Kundanika Kapadia, novelist, story writer, essayist
 Nanabhai Bhatt, educationist
 Amrutlal Yagnik, critic, biographer, essayist, editor and translator
 Sanat Mehta, politician and social activist
 Hardwar Goswami, poet, writer, and playwright
 Mansukhlal Jhaveri, poet, critic, and literary historian
 Harindra Dave, poet, journalist, playwright and novelist
 Krishnalal Jhaveri, writer, scholar, literary historian, translator, and judge
 Ramnarayan V. Pathak, poet, writer

Notable faculty
 Manilal Dwivedi, writer and philosopher
 Kantilal Vyas, linguist, critic and editor

References

External links
 

Education in Bhavnagar
Universities and colleges in Gujarat
Arts colleges in India
Schools in Colonial India
Educational institutions established in 1885
1885 establishments in British India
British colonial architecture in India